Günbağı can refer to:

 Günbağı, Elâzığ
 Günbağı, Erzincan